Danuta is a Polish given name. 

Women named Danuta include:
Danuta Bartoszek (born 1961), former long-distance runner for Canada
Danuta Bułkowska (born 1959), former Polish champion in high jumping
Danuta Dmowska (born 1982), Polish fencer and World Épée Champion 2005
Danuta Gleed (1946–1996), Canadian writer of Polish origin
Danuta Hojarska (born 1960), Polish politician, member of the Sejm
Danuta Hübner (born 1948), Polish economist, academic, and policy maker
Danuta Jazłowiecka (born 1957), Polish politician, member of the Sejm
Danuta Lato (born 1963), Polish actress, model and singer in the 1980s-1990s
Danuta Pietraszewska (born 1947), Polish politician, member of the Sejm
Danuta Wałęsa (born 1949), wife of former President of Poland Lech Wałęsa
Danuta Kobylińska-Walas (born 1931), Polish Sea Captain
Danuta Kordaczuk (1939–1988), Polish Olympic volleyball player
Danuta Kozák (born 1987), Hungarian Olympic sprint canoer
Danuta Szaflarska (1915–2017), Polish screen and stage actress

Other meanings include:
Danuta, a fictional planet in the Star Wars franchise
Danuta (armoured train), a Polish armoured train used during the invasion of Poland in 1939

See also
Danutė (disambiguation), the Lithuanian equivalent
Polish feminine given names